At least two ships of the French Navy have borne the name Achéron:

 , a  commissioned in 1932 and scuttled in 1942
 , a base ship for mine-clearance divers commissioned in 1987

See also
 

French Navy ship names